{{DISPLAYTITLE:C19H17NO7}}
The molecular formula C19H17NO7 (molar mass: 371.341 g/mol, exact mass: 371.1005 u) may refer to:

 Incyclinide
 Nedocromil

Molecular formulas